The 2000 MTV Europe Music Awards were held on 16 November 2000 at the Ericsson Globe, Stockholm.

Performers included Jennifer Lopez, Ricky Martin, Robbie Williams and Kylie Minogue. The Spice Girls performance was their last before their separation. Presenters included Kelis, Guy Ritchie, Moby and Heidi Klum.

The nominees were announced on 2 October 2000. Robbie Williams was the most nominated with 4 awards including Best Song and Best Video. Madonna and Eminem were the big winners of the night with two awards each.

Nominations
Winners are in bold text.

{| class=wikitable style="width=100%"
|-
! style="background:#EEDD85; width=50%" | Best Song
! style="background:#EEDD85; width=50%" | Best Video
|-
| valign="top" |
Robbie Williams — "Rock DJ"
 Britney Spears — "Oops!... I Did It Again"
 Madonna — "Music"
 Melanie C (featuring Lisa "Left-Eye" Lopes) — "Never Be the Same Again"
 Sonique — "It Feels So Good"
| valign="top" |
Moby — "Natural Blues"
 Blink-182 — "All the Small Things"
 Foo Fighters — "Learn to Fly"
 Red Hot Chili Peppers — "Californication"
 Robbie Williams — "Rock DJ"
|-
! style="background:#EEDD85; width=50%" | Best Album
! style="background:#EEDD85; width=50%" | 
|-
| valign="top" |
'Eminem — The Marshall Mathers LP Bon Jovi — Crush
 Macy Gray — On How Life Is
 Moby — Play
 Travis — The Man Who
| valign="top" |
|-
! style="background:#EEDD85; width=50%" | Best Female
! style="background:#EEDD85; width=50%" | Best Male
|-
| valign="top" |Madonna Britney Spears
 Janet Jackson
 Jennifer Lopez
 Melanie C
| valign="top" |Ricky Martin Eminem
 Robbie Williams
 Ronan Keating
 Sisqó
|-
! style="background:#EEDD85; width=50%" | Best Group
! style="background:#EEDD85; width=50%" | Best New Act
|-
| valign="top" |Backstreet Boys Blink-182
 Bon Jovi
 Red Hot Chili Peppers
 Travis
| valign="top" |Blink-182 Anastacia
 Bomfunk MC's
 Melanie C
 Sonique
|-
! style="background:#EEDD85; width=50%" | Best Pop
! style="background:#EEDD85; width=50%" | Best Dance
|-
| valign="top" |All Saints Backstreet Boys
 Britney Spears
 NSYNC
 Robbie Williams
| valign="top" |Madonna Artful Dodger
 Moby
 Moloko
 Sonique
|-
! style="background:#EEDD85; width=50%" | Best Rock
! style="background:#EEDD85; width=50%" | Best R&B
|-
| valign="top" |Red Hot Chili Peppers Bon Jovi
 Foo Fighters
 Korn
 Limp Bizkit
| valign="top" |Jennifer Lopez Aaliyah
 Destiny's Child
 Janet Jackson
 Sisqó
|-
! style="background:#EEDD85; width=50%" | Best Hip-Hop
! style="background:#EEDD85; width=50%" | 
|-
| valign="top" |Eminem Busta Rhymes
 Cypress Hill
 Dr. Dre
 Wyclef Jean
| valign="top" |
|-
! style="background:#EEDD82; width=50%" colspan="2" | Free Your Mind
|-
| colspan="2" style="text-align: center;" | Otpor!|}

Regional nominations
Winners are in bold''' text.

Performances
U2 — "Beautiful Day"
All Saints — "Pure Shores"
Madonna — "Music"
Spice Girls — "Holler"
Robbie Williams and Kylie Minogue — "Kids"
Moby — "Porcelain"
Jennifer Lopez — "Love Don't Cost a Thing"
Ronan Keating — "Life Is a Rollercoaster"
Guano Apes — "No Speech"
Backstreet Boys — "Shape of My Heart"
Bomfunk MCs — "Freestyler"
Ricky Martin — "She Bangs"

Appearances
Ali G and Róisín Murphy — presented Best Male
Savage Garden — presented Best Hip-Hop
Nick Carter, Kevin Richardson and Heidi Klum — presented Best R&B
Anastacia and Ronan Keating — presented Best Group
Thora Birch — presented Best Dance
Kelis and Moby — presented Best Female
Guy Ritchie — presented Best Video
Jean Reno — presented Free Your Mind Award
Jason Priestley and Kylie Minogue — presented Best Song

See also
2000 MTV Video Music Awards

References

2000
2000 music awards
2000s in Stockholm
2000 in Swedish music
November 2000 events in Europe